Shades (1986) is the fourth studio album from the jazz group Yellowjackets. The album's first track, "And You Know That", won the "Best R&B Instrumental" Grammy Award. The album debuted on the Billboard Top Jazz Album chart on 5 July 1986 and would spend 32 weeks on the chart, eventually peaking at #4. It was the last to feature drummer Ricky Lawson.

The album features the original recording of the Yellowjackets' live staple "Revelation" (featuring vocal group Perri) as well as the Donald Fagen-penned title track. "Revelation" is one of the group's most popular tunes, often covered by other artists, including Robben Ford on his Talk to Your Daughter (1988).

Track listing

Personnel 

Yellowjackets
 Russell Ferrante – keyboards
 Jimmy Haslip – 5-string bass, piccolo bass
 Ricky Lawson – acoustic drums, Simmons drums, percussion
 Marc Russo – alto saxophone

Guest musicians
 Rory Kaplan – Fairlight CMI programming
 Bill Gable – PPG Wave 2.3 programming (8)
 Bruce Hornsby – accordion (8)
 Paulinho da Costa – percussion
 Perri – vocals (4)

Production 
 Yellowjackets – producers
 Erik Zobler – engineer (basic tracks), mixing
 Gary Wagner – engineer (overdubs), mix consultant 
 Duncan Aldridge – assistant engineer
 Gerry Brown – assistant engineer
 Larry Mah – assistant engineer
 Michael Ross – assistant engineer
 Brian Gardner – mastering
Jeff Lancaster (L-Shape Ltd.) – art direction
 Dennis Keeley – photography
 Gerry Puhara – styling
 Gary Borman (Kragen & Co.)  – management

Studios
 Recorded at Bill Schnee Studios and Mad Hatter Studios (Los Angeles, CA).
 Mixed at Soundcastle and Mama Jo's Recording Studio (Hollywood, CA).
 Mastered at Bernie Grundman Mastering (Hollywood, CA).

Awards
1986 - 29th Annual GRAMMY Awards

References

1986 albums
Yellowjackets albums
Albums produced by David Hentschel
MCA Records albums